The Box of Life is a 2002 Syrian-French drama film directed by Usama Muhammad. It was screened in the Un Certain Regard section at the 2002 Cannes Film Festival.

Cast
 Zuhair Abdulkarim - 3rd Man
 Caresse Bashar - 2nd Woman
 Elias Ghannam - 3rd Boy
 Meerna Ghannam - Fairouza
 Muhammad Hamad - 2nd Boy
 Fares Helou - 2nd Man
 Nihal Khateeb - Kubra
 Bassam Kousa - 1st Man
 Ali Muhammad - Akhdar
 Amal Omran - 1st Woman
 Hala Omran - 3rd Woman
 Maha Saleh - Khadra
 Mustafa Sbeih - 1st Boy
 Rafiq Subaie - Akbar

References

External links

2002 films
2002 drama films
Syrian drama films
2000s Arabic-language films
Films directed by Ossama Mohammed
French drama films
2000s French films